Goczałkowice Reservoir is an artificial water reservoir close to Goczałkowice-Zdrój in the Silesian Voivodeship in Poland created with a dam on the Vistula in 1956. The area of the reservoir is 32 square kilometres and its capacity is 168 million m³. It is around 75 kilometres west of Kraków.

The shores of the lake are the breeding area for many bird species.

Reservoirs in Poland
Buildings and structures in Silesian Voivodeship
Landforms of Silesian Voivodeship
Pszczyna County